Acacia calantha is a shrub belonging to the genus Acacia and the subgenus Phyllodineae native to Queensland in Australia.

Description
It has slender, glabrous yellowish brown to grey branchlets with green to grey green phyllodes. They have a prominent midrib which becomes angled with three or four distinct longitudinal ridges when dry. The simple inflorescences appear in the axil nodes as single spherical flower-heads containing around 30 bright golden flowers.

Taxonomy
The species was first formally described by the botanist Leslie Pedley in 1979 in the work A revision of Acacia Mill. in Queensland as published in the journal Austrobaileya.  Pedley then reclassified the shrub in 1987 as Racosperma calanthum but it was transferred back to the current name in 2001.

Distribution
The shrub is native to an area around Cracow in south eastern Queensland in the Dawson River catchment. It is found on the lower slopes of steep sandstone hills and ridges growing in sandy to sandy-clay soils as a pat of dry sclerophyll forest communities as is often associated with species including Corymbia maculata, Corymbia trachyphloia, Eucalyptus crebra, Eucalyptus cloeziana, Eucalyptus citriodora, Corymbia tessellaris, Angophora leiocarpa, Lysicarpus angustifolius,  Acacia podalyriifolia and Acacia crassa.

See also
 List of Acacia species

References

calantha
Flora of Queensland
Plants described in 1979
Taxa named by Leslie Pedley